The 2022–23 season is the 111th in the history of Frosinone Calcio and their fourth consecutive season in the second division. The club is participating in Serie B and Coppa Italia.

Players

Out on loan

Pre-season and friendlies

Competitions

Overall record

Serie B

League table

Results summary

Results by round

Matches 
The league fixtures were announced on 15 July 2022.

Coppa Italia

References 

Frosinone Calcio seasons
Frosinone